"Until the Night" is a song written by Billy Joel for his 1978 album, 52nd Street. Although passed over for single release in the US, "Until the Night" was issued as the second single from 52nd Street in the UK - following "My Life" - in March 1979 and reached #50 on the UK Singles Chart.

Various versions of the single are in existence for different countries, with different B-sides including "Root Beer Rag", "Big Shot", and "Just the Way You Are" (all on CBS label). "Until the Night" is also included on the 2005 Billy Joel four-CD and one-DVD compilation entitled My Lives (in reference to the song "My Life").

Music and lyrics
Music lecturer Ken Bielen described "Until the Night" as a "big ballad in the Righteous Brothers  tradition.  Joel biographer Mark Bego described it as a "dramatic sweeping ballad that sounds as if it is straight out of the Phil Spector songbook.  According to Bego, the song was written as a tribute to the Righteous Brothers.  The arrangement features many instruments, including strings, horns and castanets, that give it a sound reminiscent of the Righteous Brothers' 1960s hits.  Richie Cannata contributes a jazzy saxophone solo in the middle of the song.  Joel sings parts of the song in a higher voice and other parts in a deeper voice, and sometimes these two voices are double tracked, which also produces a sound reminiscent of the Righteous Brothers.

The lyrics describe a romance where the couple has to separate each morning so each can go to work.  They are insecure about the relationship, but when they get back together in the evening everything is ok.

Reception
Ultimate Classic Rock critic Dave Lifton rated "Until the Night" as Joel's 6th best love song, describing it as "an homage to the sweeping urban romanticism of Phil Spector's work with the Righteous Brothers."  Pop culture historian Andrew Ross described "Until the Night" as a "schlock masterpiece."  Rolling Stone critic Stephen Holden described "Until the Night" as "the formal piece de resistance of an album that, though far from great, boasts much of the color and excitement of a really good New York street fair." Billboard critic Melinda Newman called it an example of Joel "at his most tender and romantic." Allmusic critic Stephen Thomas Erlewine said that "Until the Night" is among Joel's best songs.

Personnel 
 Billy Joel – vocals, acoustic piano
 Richie Cannata – organ, saxophones, clarinet
 Steve Khan – electric guitar, acoustic guitar, backing vocals
 Hugh McCracken – nylon string guitar
 Doug Stegmeyer – bass, backing vocals
 Liberty DeVitto – drums
 David Freidman – orchestral chimes and percussion
 Robert Freedman – horn and string orchestration

Cover versions

"Until the Night" was recorded by Czech singer Helena Vondráčková as "In der Nacht"
for her 1979 album Doch in der Nacht, which comprised German-language renderings of Billy Joel songs. This version was issued as the album's single with "Ein Engel, der weiß, was er will" (originally "She's Always a Woman") as the B-side.
Bill Medley of the Righteous Brothers recorded "Until the Night" for his 1980 album Sweet Thunder.  Charlie McCoy covered the song with Laney Smallwood in 1981.  The single reached #92 on the Billboard Hot Country Songs chart.

Chart positions

References

Sources
 52nd Street copyright 1978, Sony Entertainment Inc.
 My Lives, copyright 2005, Sony BMG Music Entertainment.

1979 singles
Billy Joel songs
Songs written by Billy Joel
Song recordings produced by Phil Ramone
Columbia Records singles
1978 songs